The Sporting Club is a 1971 American comedy film directed by Larry Peerce and written by Lorenzo Semple Jr. It is based the 1968 novel The Sporting Club by Thomas McGuane. The film stars Robert Fields, Nicolas Coster, Maggie Blye, Jack Warden, Richard Dysart and William Roerick. The film was released on February 28, 1971, by Avco Embassy Pictures.

Plot

Cast       
Robert Fields as Vernur Stanton
Nicolas Coster as James Quinn
Maggie Blye as Janey
Jack Warden as Earl Olive
Richard Dysart as Spengler
William Roerick as Fortesque
Logan Ramsey as Scott
Leon B. Stevens as Olds
John Seymour as Newcombe
Helen Craig as Mrs. Olds
Diane Rousseau as Barbara
Lois Markle as Sheilah
James Noble as Canon Pritchard
Ralph Puroum as Murray
Ralph Waite as Olson
Jo Ann Harris as Lu
Linda Blair as Barby
Anne Ramsey as Scott's Wife (Uncredited)

References

External links
 
 

1971 films
American comedy films
1971 comedy films
Films based on American novels
Films with screenplays by Lorenzo Semple Jr.
Films directed by Larry Peerce
Films scored by Michael Small
Embassy Pictures films
1970s English-language films
1970s American films